Albert Benedict Wolfe (August 23, 1876 – June 3, 1967) was an American economist.

Life 
Wolfe was born in 1876. He died in 1967.

Career 
He has served as a president of the American Economic Association.

Bibliography 
Some of his books are:

 Readings in social problems 

 Savers' surplus and the interest rate
 Social problems, an analytical outline for students
  Works committees and Joint industrial councils

References

External links
 AEA past presidents
 

American economists
People from Bureau County, Illinois
1876 births
1967 deaths
Presidents of the American Economic Association
Harvard Graduate School of Arts and Sciences alumni